The American Mental Health Foundation (AMHF) is a not-for-profit organization dedicated to the welfare of individuals with emotional problems and advancing mental-health research. AMHF is established to organize educational seminars and to disseminate its knowledge.

History 
AMHF was chartered in 1924 and incorporated in New York State in 1954 as a 501(c)(3) not-for-profit organization, so recognized by the U.S. federal government. Former chairmen include Hon. Harvey J. Ross of the 143rd (1920) New York State Legislature, Austrian writer-in-exile Hermann Broch (whom James Joyce helped aid in the escape from the Nazis following the Anschluss of March 1938) and Richard Weil Jr., one-time head of Macy's Department Store. The chairman from February 18, 2010, to May 1, 2016, was John P. Fowler (publisher of "National Review," then its vice president and a director of National Review Institute to February 2019). Ms. Jacqueline A. Lofaro assumed chairmanship on March 29, 2017. Michelle Harrison, M.D., trained as a psychopharmacologist, is the newest board member: elected on June 26, 2018.

As part of its educational mission, the organization has maintained a dedication to diversity and making mental-health services available to everyone, regardless of culture, race, or sexual orientation. Former director of research Stefan Sarkozy de Somogyi Schill (known professionally as Stefan de Schill) pioneered in group psychotherapy, as well an advocacy for gay individuals when he took a position favoring Lyndon Baines Johnson aide Walter Jenkins, whose alleged homosexuality (the term used then) became a political issue.

An early affiliate and clinical supervisor was Otto Kauders. In 1948, de Schill was appointed director of research, following a recommendation by AMHF chairman at the time—Broch (then with Princeton University) as well as Kauders—remaining so until his death on February 9, 2005. The position of executive director was filled by Evander Lomke shortly after. 
In the 1960s, de Schill defended LBJ aide Walter Jenkins during a Washington scandal. As part of his work in group psychotherapy for AMHF, during the 1970s through the 1990s, de Schill co-edited (with Serge Lebovici), singly edited, as well as contributed to several books devoted to these modalities: The Challenge to Psychoanalysis and Psychotherapy (Jessica Kingsley, 1999) and The Challenge for Group Psychotherapy (International Universities Press, 1974). Crucial Choices—Crucial Changes: The Resurrection of Psychotherapy was issued in 2000 by Prometheus and republished by AMHF Books in 2012. De Schill's work, under AMHF, has appeared in French A la recherche de l'avenir, German Psychoanalytische Therapie in Gruppen, and Italian Terapia psicoanalitica di gruppo.

In 2016 (April 10), AMHF again appeared in The New York Times in a letter from executive director Evander Lomke rebutting the medical practice of "growth attenuation" among young people with serious disabilities. Also in April 2016, AMHF issued a monograph describing two years of collaborative research with Astor Services for Children & Families regarding early signs of schizophrenia and other psychoses, and palliation/prevention. On March 27, 2017, Lomke placed an op-ed, on coping with the psychological dimensions of fear, anxiety and social stress, and terrorism in the San Francisco Chronicle. On October 18, 2018, an article co-written (and headed) by Dr. Raymond B. Flannery Jr. and Lomke, entitled "SUDEP and Grief: Overview and Current Issues," appeared online, and then in conventional-print format, in the peer-reviewed journal Psychiatric Quarterly.

Beginning summer 2014, AMHF embarked on a research project with Pearson Assessment to measure older individuals, in the serious-to-profound range of intellectual disabilities, for behavioral changes. Such a test would be in the mode of the existing Wechsler, Vineland, and Bayley Scales and have wide-ranging applications. AMHF is awaiting further funding (as of 2024) to continue. The findings of the AMHF 2-year study with Astor Services for Children & Families were issued by American Mental Health Foundation Books in April 2016 (see below under American Mental Health Foundation Books).

Guiding publications, blogs, and research endeavors is an advisory board with mental-health specialists, including Eric J. Green, Ph.D., James Campbell Quick, Ph.D., Jeanine Lee Skorinko Ph.D., Paul Quinnett, Ph.D., and Alexis Tomarken. M.S.W., Ph.D. Each is an authority in a specialized field relevant to the AMHF mission, respectively: psychoanalysis, psychodynamic therapy, cognitive behavioral therapy, spirituality and mental health, PTSD, the DSM-5, depression and suicide, the type of grief that does not dispel, as well as developmental disabilities and autism. An ongoing blog as well as messages on Twitter and Facebook allow the Foundation to bring its cutting-edge research, advocacy, and activism to its followers.

American Mental Health Foundation Books 
AMHF supports the written work of PTSD (posttraumatic stress disorder) researcher and authority Flannery, clinical psychologist formerly with Harvard Medical School and The University of Massachusetts Medical School, by publishing The Violent Person: Professional Risk Management Strategies for Safety and Care in November 2009; in April 2016 Violence: Why People Do Bad Things, with Strategies to Reduce that Risk; and on February 10, 2022, advance copies of Preventing Youth Violence Before It Begins (Spring 2022). The Violent Person received notices in peer-reviewed journals. Flannery's concise Coping with Anxiety in an Age of Terrorism, was published June 2017. Flannery's book on the nationally recognized program he developed is titled The Assaulted Staff Action Program (ASAP). Altogether, American Mental Health Foundation Books publishes 9 titles by Dr. Flannery.

Working with the Erich Fromm estate and its literary executor, Dr. Rainer Funk, four posthumous books by Fromm have been reissued as well as issued for the first time by the publishing division of AMHF (American Mental Health Foundation Books) in 2010. Included are The Pathology of Normalcy, Beyond Freud, The Heart of Man, and The Revolution of Hope. Fromm, an original member of the loose association known as the Frankfurt School of social theorists, writes in the neo-Freudian tradition on topics such as free will, the vulnerability of populations to dictators and fascism, the disruptive role of emerging technology on human personality and human nature. There was a special focus on the virtue of hope, which he saw as an antidote to the preceding conditions and portals of enlightenment. This publishing arrangement runs through February 7, 2025.

With Astor Services for Children & Families from 2012 to 2014 (as noted above), AMHF has responded to a need noted by Paul Gionfriddo in the screening of several-thousand youth in a county-wide catchment area, to identify approximately 15 at-risk individuals who will receive a palliative-prevention treatment.

American Mental Health Foundation Books is also the publisher of Dr. Henry Kellerman on personality formation (2012), delusion (2015), individuals in institutional settings (2016), the psychodynamics of group therapy (1979, 2015), and the origin of language as embedded in the child's emotional life (2021); May 11, 2018 (see Select Publications, below), Psychotherapeutic Traction: Uncovering the Patient's Power-theme and Basic-wish was issued, and in 2020 Dr. Kellerman's Curing Psychological Symptoms along with The Origin of Language (2021)...Kellerman's The Psychoanalytic Codes: Encryption and Decryption and What Is Your Diagnosis Saying to You? The Nomenclature of Psychology are scheduled for 2024 ; PTSD expert Dr. James Campbell Quick (along with Drs. Joanne H. Gavin and David J. Gavin) was published by AMHF in 2013 on the psychology of personal fulfillment for women.

In addition to its traditional forms of publishing and educational seminars, AMHF offered its first interactive Webinars, by Jungian therapist Dr. Eric J. Green of its professional-advisory board, in September and November, 2014, respectively, on the subjects of adult-play therapy and children in crisis. Future Webinars are planned. Others are available on the AMHF homepage.

American Mental Health Foundation Books is distributed to the book trade by Ingram. William Van Ornum, clinical psychologist, former professor at Marist College and Fellow of the American Psychological Association, is a special adviser to the publishing program and is also on the professional advisory board, referenced above. The current President and executive director of AMHF is the above-named Evander Lomke.

Select publications by AMHF Books 
Flannery, R. B. Jr. (1998, 2012). The Assaulted Staff Program (ASAP).
Flannery, R. B. Jr. (2016). Violence: Why People Do Bad Things, with Strategies to Reduce that Risk.
Flannery, R. B. Jr. (2017). Coping with Anxiety in an Age of Terrorism
Flannery, R. B. Jr. (2022). Preventing Youth Violence Before It Begins
Gavin, J. H., Quick, J. C., and Gavin, D. J. (2013). Live Your Dreams, Change the World: The Psychology of Personal Fulfillment for Women.
Kellerman, H. (2012). Personality: How It Forms.
Kellerman, H. (2016). There's No Handle on My Door: Stories of Mental Patients in Mental Hospitals.
Kellerman, H. (2018). Psychotherapeutic Traction: Uncovering the Patient's Basic Wish and Power-Theme
Kellerman, H. (2021). The Origin of Language
Mary Nichols, Suzanne Button, Katherine Hoople, and Laura Lappan (2016). Early Identification, Palliative Care, and Prevention of Psychotic Disorders in Children and Youth (monograph of AMHF 2-year study).

References

External links 
American Mental Health Foundation

Psychology organizations based in the United States
Mental health organizations in New York (state)